Trdat the Architect (circa 940s – 1020) was the chief architect of the Bagratid kings of Armenia, and most notable for his design of the cathedral at Ani and his reconstruction of the dome of Hagia Sophia in Constantinople.

Work

Armenia 
Trdat was active in Armenia before and after his reconstruction of the Hagia Sophia. In 961, Ashot III moved his capital from Kars to the great city of Ani where he assembled new palaces and rebuilt the walls. The Catholicosate was moved to the Argina district in the suburbs of Ani where Trdat completed the building of the Catholicosal palace and the Mother Cathedral of Ani. This cathedral offers an example of a cruciform domed church within a rectangular plan. Trdat is also believed to have designed or supervised the construction of Surb Nshan (Holy Sign, completed in 991), the oldest structure at Haghpat Monastery.

Byzantine Empire 

After a great earthquake in 989 partly collapsed the dome of Hagia Sophia, Byzantine officials summoned Trdat to Byzantium to organize its repair. The rebuilt dome was completed by 994. As the contemporary Armenian historian Stepanos Taronetsi (Asoghik) comment

References

Further reading
 Maranci, Christina. "The Architect Trdat: Building Practices and Cross-Cultural Exchange in Byzantium and Armenia," The Journal of the Society of Architectural Historians 62/3 (September 2003), pp. 294–305.
 ___. "The Architect Trdat: From the Great Church at Ani to the Great Church at Constantinople," in Armenian Kars and Ani, ed. Richard G. Hovannisian. Costa Mesa, CA: Mazda Publishers, 2011, pp. 101–26. 
  Toramanian, Toros. Նյութեր հայկական ճարտարապետության պատմության [Materials for the History of Armenian Architecture]. Yerevan: ArmFan Publishing, 1948, vol. 2.

External links
 The Ani cathedral
 Cities and sites in Armenia
 The Tetraconch Church
 Armenian Architecture
 Visit Armenia Website
 Christianity and Armenian Culture
 St. Sophia Church

Ethnic Armenian architects
Byzantine architects
Byzantine people of Armenian descent
940s births
1020 deaths
People from Bagratid Armenia
10th-century Armenian people
11th-century Armenian people
10th-century Byzantine people
11th-century Byzantine people
10th-century architects
11th-century architects